The Hôtel de Pontalba is a hôtel particulier, a type of large townhouse of France, at 41 Rue du Faubourg Saint-Honoré in the 8th arrondissement of Paris. It has been the official residence of the United States Ambassador to France since 1971.

History 
In 1710, Henri François d'Aguesseau, Chancellor of France, acquired a tract of land which included the present site of the Hôtel de Pontalba. Ten years later, he built a house, and the house subsequently passed through a series of owners. New Orleans-born Baroness Micaela Almonester de Pontalba purchased the property in 1836, and by 1842, she had demolished the d'Aguesseau house and commissioned the architect Louis Visconti to design a newer house for the site.

Construction of the mansion was finished in 1855. Baroness de Pontalba occupied the mansion until her death in 1874, upon which it was willed to her heirs who sold the property to Baron Edmond James de Rothschild in 1876. Baron de Rothschild hired Felix Langlais to substantially renovate, enlarge, and embellish the residence, leaving only the original gatehouse and portals intact, but following much of the H-shaped ground floor plan.

During World War II, the mansion, then owned by Baron Maurice de Rothschild, was requisitioned by Nazi Germany as an officers' club for the Luftwaffe. After the war, it was rented out to the British Royal Air Force Club, and then to the U.S. In 1948, the American government purchased the building, primarily for the United States Information Service. These offices were moved to the Hôtel Talleyrand as restoration was completed in 1971 during the tenure of Ambassador Arthur K. Watson. The building then became the official residence of the ambassador.

See also 

 France–United States relations
 Embassy of the United States, Paris
 Deerfield Residence (Dublin residence of the US Ambassador to Ireland)
 Winfield House (London residence of the US Ambassador to the UK)

References

External links 

 Official Residence of the Ambassador
 Website of the Embassy of the United States in Paris

Houses completed in 1855
Buildings and structures in the 8th arrondissement of Paris
Ambassadorial residences
Buildings of the United States government
France–United States relations
Pontalba
Luftwaffe
Official residences in France
Rothschild family residences
Royal Air Force